IBM Rochester is the facility of IBM in Rochester, Minnesota. The initial structure was designed by Eero Saarinen, who clad the structure in blue panels of varying hues after being inspired by the Minnesota sky, as well as IBM's nickname of "Big Blue". These features and the facility's size has earned it the nickname "The Big Blue Zoo" from employees.

History

Early years 
Groundbreaking for the facility took place on July 31, 1956.  When it was first completed, there was 576,000 square feet (53,500 m2) of floor space. There is 3.1 million square feet (290,000 m2) today on the main campus, more than half the size of the Pentagon in Arlington, Virginia. Rumors have appeared over the years suggesting that the structure was designed to look like a punched card from above, but this is more due to the facility's expansion over the years rather than an intention by Saarinen.

The building was first dedicated in 1958, but has been expanded considerably since then.

Current developments 

Employment at the site has gone through several cycles of growth and collapse, but is over twice what it was in the 1950s.

On May 4, 2016, it was announced that IBM would consolidate its remaining employees into the eight buildings on the east side of the complex and sell the remaining facilitates to a separate entity. This occurred after years of IBM renting out its various facilities to companies it had spun or sold off such as HGST. The site's employee count (excluding contractors) was reported to be 2,740 in 2013 and 2,791 in 2017, a steep decline from the high of over 8,000.

In February 2018 the property was sold to Industrial Realty Group of Los Angeles.

On April 24, 2018, in a presentation to the local community, it was announced that the name of the site would be changed to the Rochester Technology Campus.

Products 
The mile-long facility is best known as the plant that produced the AS/400 computer system. The AS/400 system was itself an advancement of the System/38 that was introduced several years earlier with an inbuilt Relational Data Base Management System (RDBMS) making it leading edge for its time. The AS/400 was later rebranded as the iSeries. Development of the OS/400 operating system, now known as IBM i, continues at Rochester.

IBM Power Systems development is still done at this site.

PureSystems were originally assembled at this site, but are now mainly assembled in New York and Mexico.

The IBM 3740 Data Entry System was developed at the facility in 1973 and the follow-on IBM 5280 Distributed Data System had its beginnings there as well, but was transferred in 1981 to the Austin, TX facility, where it was released for production. The advent of personal computing swallowed up this type of data entry by 1990.

The IBM 5110 personal computer was developed and manufactured in the facility.

IBM Rochester played an important in the Summit and Sierra supercomputers.

RS/6000, now System p, and hard disk development also occurred at this site in the past.

Distinctions 
The AS/400 division at the plant received the Malcolm Baldrige National Quality Award in 1990. In November 2004, the facility claimed the top spot in the TOP500 list of fast supercomputers with a prototype Blue Gene/L system containing 32,768 processors. It clocked in at 70.72 teraflops. The manufacturing output of the site is so great that if it were a separate company, it would be the world's third-largest computer producer.

The plant, which is near U.S. Highway 52 in the northwestern part of Rochester, was recognized in 1990 by the National Building Museum as one of the significant contributions of IBM to the built environment of the United States, along with IBM's New York City headquarters and the IBM building in Atlanta, Georgia.

Tenants 
Hitachi Global Storage Technologies, although having been spun off from IBM Storage Technology, remains on-site, leasing otherwise unused space from IBM. Along with the Mayo Clinic, the IBM plant is one of the biggest employers in the Rochester area, reportedly numbering around 5,000 in 2002.

In 2019, Crenlo LLC rented part of the IBM facility to move part of its EMCORE manufacturing division, where it is currently separate from the Crenlo Cab Manufacturing line of products, as EMCORE was sold in 2021.

References
(Winter 1990). Honor Award 1990. Blueprints Vol. VIII, No. 1, p. 8. National Building Museum.
IBM Rochester: A Half Century of Innovation (IBM, 2006—a commemorative history prepared by the Charles Babbage Institute based on interviews and documentary research) available on line from the CBI website.
Oral history interview with Glenn Henry, Charles Babbage Institute, University of Minnesota. Subjects include IBM Midrange AS/400 development at IBM Rochester.
IBM Rochester from the IBM Archives

External links 

IBM facilities
Eero Saarinen structures
Buildings and structures in Rochester, Minnesota